Mushegh I Mamikonian (also spelled Mushel; d. 377/8) was an Armenian military officer from the Mamikonian family, who occupied the hereditary office of sparapet (generalissimo) of the Kingdom of Armenia under the Arsacid kings Pap and Varazdat. He took part in the Armenian resistance against the forces of the Sasanian monarch Shapur II, notably taking part in the Battle of Bagavan, where the Iranian forces were defeated. He was the regent of Armenia under the young and inexperienced Varazdat, who eventually suspected him of posing a danger to his rule, and thus had him executed, in 377/8.

Mushegh may be identical with the Artabanes mentioned in the works of the contemporary Roman historian Ammianus Marcellinus.

Background 
Mushegh was a son of the Armenian sparapet (generalissimo) Vasak I Mamikonian. The Mamikonian family controlled the northwestern Tayk province near the Iberian border. They also hereditarily held the office of sparapet, which was the most important office after that of the king. Vasak was the leader of the pro-Roman party in Armenia which supported King Arshak II. However, with the death of Roman emperor Julian at the Battle of Samarra in 363, Roman forces withdrew from Armenia, thus exposing it to the Sasanian Empire. This eventually forced Arshak II, as well as many Armenian nobles, such as Vasak, to leave for the Iranian court to pledge their allegiance to the Sasanian King of Kings Shapur II. However, Arshak II's refusal to accept Shapur II's demands resulted in his imprisonment in the Castle of Oblivion, while Vasak was tortured to death. With the elimination of Arshak II (who, according to Faustus of Byzantium, soon committed suicide), Shapur II sent his forces into Armenia.

Biography 

Arshak II's widow, Queen Parandzem, organized a resistance and sent a delegation under Mushegh to the Romans to ask for help on the behalf of Arshak II's son Pap. The Romans, however, were reluctant to engage in a war and support Armenia, which had been devastated by the Iranian forces. In the winter of 369/370, Pharantzem was killed by Iranian forces, while numerous sites, including the capital of Artaxata, were destroyed. Pap fled to Roman territory, and later returned in 371 with help from the Roman emperor Valens, and Pap ascended the Armenian throne. In the same year, a combined Armenian-Roman army defeated the Iranians at the Battle of Bagavan. Mushegh, who took part in the battle, wounded the Albanian king Urnayr (a vassal of Shapur II), but allowed him to escape. The 5th-century Armenian historian Faustus gives a large amount of credit for the victory to Mushegh. 

With this victory, many of the Armenian nakharars (magnates) who had previously defected to Shapur II in 360s, were now under Mushegh's control. Mushegh, however, was greatly criticized by Pap for sparing Urnayr. However, they ultimately reconciled, with Pap providing Mushegh with many gifts, honors and villages. 

When Urnayr returned to Albania, he sent a message to Mushegh thanking him for sparing his life, and also informed him of a surprise attack planned by Shapur II. According to Faustus, Mushegh assembled all the Armenian troops, which numbered about 90,000. According to Ian Hughes, "If P'awstos' numbers are correct, it would appear that for this conflict the entire army of Armenia was gathered to fight Shapur, leaving all other borders undefended – a risk that Pap and Mushegh were willing to take in face of the Persian threat." Mushegh was also reinforced by a Roman force led by Terentius. The Iranian army—led by Shapur II himself—was defeated and routed at the border near Ganzak. Mushegh and Terentius then left the hayr mardpet (grand chamberlain) Cylaces (Glak) with an army of 30,000 to protect the border. Cylaces soon sent messengers to Shapur, promising to betray Pap, Mushegh, and Terentius to the Iranians. However, this ploy was discovered by Pap, who had Cylaces assassinated.

Peace was subsequently made between Iran and Rome, with Armenia becoming a protectorate of the latter once more. However, Pap was soon murdered at the behest of Valens due to his disobedience towards the Roman emperor. The Romans then installed another Arsacid named Varazdat on the Armenian throne, with Mushegh becoming his regent. In 377, Valens was forced to call his forces in Armenia back to wage war with the Goths, which quickly resulted in the destabilization of Armenia. Varazdat, who was young and impressionable, was by convinced by a group of Armenian nobles that Mushegh posed a danger to his rule, and had played a part in Pap's murder. Varazdat therefore had Mushegh killed at a banquet and appointed his tutor (dayeak) Bat Saharuni as the new sparapet, in violation of tradition. Mushegh's family and relatives put his body on a high tower, believing that the spirits (aralez) would descend and bring him back to life.

After Mushegh's murder, his kinsman Manuel Mamikonian returned from captivity in Iran and drove Varazdat out of the country to avenge Mushegh. Manuel spared the life of the young king, but killed Bat Saharuni. Manuel then placed Varazdat's young cousins Arshak and Vagharshak on the throne.

Mushegh may be identical with the Artabanes mentioned in the works of the contemporary Roman historian Ammianus Marcellinus. Both were military officers; both are said to have led the negotiations with Valens which resulted in Pap's return to Armenia; and both were accused of treason. However, Mushegh was murdered after Pap's death, while Artabanes was killed by Pap's orders due suspicion of treason. Lenski thinks, on the contrary, that Artabanes was Vahan Mamikonian, the Apostate.

References

Bibliography

Ancient works 
Faustus of Byzantium, History of the Armenians.

Modern works

Further reading 
 .

Sparapets
Armenian nobility
4th-century Armenian people
Ancient Armenian generals
Mushegh 01
370s deaths